Harry Garson (1882 – September 21, 1938) was an American film director and producer. He directed 29 films between 1920 and 1934, and produced 11 films before that. He was born in Rochester, New York and died in Los Angeles, California.

Selected filmography

 The Unpardonable Sin (1919) co-producer
 The Forbidden Woman (1920)
 For the Soul of Rafael (1920) 
 Mid-Channel (1920)
 Whispering Devils (1920)
 Charge It (1921)
 Straight from Paris (1921)
 Hush (1921)
 The Sign of the Rose (1922) director
 The Hands of Nara (1922) director
 The Woman of Bronze (1923) producer
 An Old Sweetheart of Mine (1923) director
 Thundering Dawn (1923) director
 The College Boob (1923) director
 The No-Gun Man (1924) director
 The Millionaire Cowboy (1924) director
 Breed of the Border (1924) director
 High and Handsome (1925) 
 Smilin' at Trouble (1925)
 Heads Up (1925)
 Speed Wild (1925)
 Mulhall's Greatest Catch (1926) director
 Sir Lumberjack (1926)
 The Traffic Cop (1926) director
 Glenister of the Mounted (1926) director
 The Beast of Borneo (1934) director

References

External links

1882 births
1938 deaths
American film directors
American film producers